James Francis Lanphier (August 31, 1920February 11, 1969) was an American actor who did a variety of work for Blake Edwards. He portrayed Saloud in the 1963 film The Pink Panther, and also appeared in films such as Darling Lili (1970) and the television series Peter Gunn (1958–61).

Biography
Lanphier was born at Mitchel Field, New York, to Janet Grant Cobb and Thomas George Lanphier Sr. He had two brothers, Thomas Jr. and Charles.

Lanphier made his stage debut as a juvenile in an army post drama. He debuted on Broadway as a dancer in Mexican Hayride in 1944 and played Mr. Atkins in a production of Dark of the Moon the following year. He began his acting career on American television in 1949.

In 1957 Lanphier made his feature film debut in an uncredited role in The Deadly Mantis (1957). Several other minor roles followed including small roles in Blake Edwards' The Perfect Furlough (1958), Operation Petticoat (1959) and High Time (1960), then two appearances on Edwards' Peter Gunn television series. On the third season of the show Lanphier became a regular where he played Leslie, a former mobster and gourmet.

He played a landlord in Edwards' Experiment in Terror (1962) then acted as a dialogue coach on Edwards' Days of Wine and Roses (1962) and The Pink Panther (1963) where he played Saloud, one of his many roles where he played a Middle Eastern or Indian gentleman. He made minor appearances in more of Edwards' films, including What Did You Do in the War, Daddy? (1966) as an Italian villager, The Party (1968) as Harry, and his final role in Darling Lili (1970) as a Hungarian maître d'hôtel, released after his death.

Lanphier died on February 11, 1969.

Filmography

References

External links 
 
 

1920 births
1969 deaths
American male film actors
20th-century American male actors
People from Hempstead (town), New York